Castelseprio is a comune (municipality) in the Province of Varese in the Italian region Lombardy, located about  northwest of Milan and about  south of Varese, bordering the municipalities of Cairate, Carnago, Gornate-Olona and Lonate Ceppino.

The main centre, formerly known as Vico Seprio (a name still in informal local use) is near the historically significant ruins of the ancient and medieval city of Castelseprio, which are today in an archaeological zone open to the public at the normal hours.  The site is most famous for the Byzantinesque frescos in the small Church of Santa Maria foris portas, a UNESCO World Heritage Site since 2011.

Demographic evolution

References 

Cities and towns in Lombardy